Mining Department can refer to:

Mine Design Department of the British Royal Navy
Mining Department (AFL), American labor union organization
Ministry of Mining Department (Maharashtra), Indian government ministry